Heinrich von Ranke (8 May 1830, Rückersdorf – 13 May 1909, Munich) was a German physiologist and pediatrician. He was the son of theologian Friedrich Heinrich Ranke (1798-1876) and the brother of anthropologist Johannes Ranke (1836-1916). Famed historian Leopold von Ranke (1795-1886) was his uncle.

Biography 
Ranke studied at the Universities of Berlin, Leipzig, Erlangen, and Tübingen. At Erlangen, he was a student of the chemist Eugen von Gorup-Besánez, and at Berlin, he was an assistant to physiologist Johannes Peter Müller (1849–50). In 1851 he obtained his doctorate with a dissertation involving physiological-chemical studies on the behaviour of some organic substances in humans.

From 1853 to 1858, he was associated with the German Hospital in London, during which time, he also served as a civilian physician in the service of the British government in Smyrna and in the Crimea (1855–56). In 1859 he received his habilitation at the University of Munich, becoming an honorary professor in 1863. In 1866 he was appointed director of the children's polyclinic at the Reisingerianum in Munich. Here he worked together with Max Sandreczky who became his assistant, and probably influenced Sandreczky's decision to dedicate his career to the care of children. In 1874 Ranke became an associate professor, and in 1886, was named as director of Hauner's Kinderspital at the university.

Published works 
 Physiologisch-chemische Untersuchungen über das Verhalten einiger organischer Stoffe im menschlichen Organismus nebst Versuchen über die diuretische Wirkung mehrerer Arzneimittel, 1851 – Physiological-chemical studies on the behavior of some organic substances in the human organism, along with experiments on the diuretic effect of several drugs.
 Acht Tage bei unseren Verwundeten in den entlegeneren Spitälern, 1866.
 Studien zur Wirkung des Chloroforms, Aethers, Amylens, 1867 – Studies on the effects of chloroform, ether and amylene.
 Cholera-Infections-Versuche an weissen Mäusen, 1874 – Cholera infection experiments on white mice.
 Experimenteller Beweis der Möglichkeit der Selbstentzündung des Heues (Liebig's Annalen CLXVII), – Experimental evidence of the possibility of spontaneous combustion of hay.
 Zur Aetiologie der Spina bifida, 1878 – The aetiology of spina bifida.
 Zur Münchener Canalisationsfrage, 1879.

See also
Max Sandreczky

References 

1830 births
1909 deaths
People from Nürnberger Land
Academic staff of the Ludwig Maximilian University of Munich
German pediatricians
German physiologists